Wang Chong (王翀; born 8 January 1982) is an avant-garde theatre director and translator. His works have been performed in 16 countries. Wang's Chinese experimental theatre includes multimedia performance and documentary theatre.

Life
Wang graduated from Peking University with a degree in law and economics. Since then, he has studied theatre in China and the U.S., working with influential directors Lin Zhaohua and Robert Wilson.

In 2008, Wang Chong founded Théatre du Rêve Expérimental (薪传实验剧团), a Beijing-based performance group. It soon became one of the most active touring companies in China. His works include: The Warfare of Landmine 2.0, winning 2013 Festival/Tokyo Award; Lu Xun, noted by The Beijing News as The Best Chinese Performance of Year 2016; Teahouse 2.0, winning One Drama Award The Best Little Theater Performance of Year 2017; Thunderstorm 2.0, noted as one of The Best Ten Little Theatre Works in China, 1982-2012.

At the start of year 2016, Wang stopped using cellphone and social networks. He currently lives in The De-electrified Territory (TDT, or Ting Dian Ting), a self-designed Beijing apartment that has no electricity and no electronics.

Theatre Works

Translations

Plays:
 Hamletmachine by Heiner Muller
 Crave by Sarah Kane
 The Vagina Monologues by Eve Ensler
 The Agony and the Ecstasy of Steve Jobs by Mike Daisey
 Constellations by Nick Payne
 The Heretic by Richard Bean
 Electronic City by Falk Richter
 The Arabian Night by Roland Schimmelpfennig
 Miss Julie by Katie Mitchell after August Strindberg and Inger Christensen
 Father's Braid by Amnon Levy and Rami Danon 
 Ibsen in One Take by Oda Fiskum (co-translation)
 Tokyo Notes by Hirata Oriza (co-translation)
 The Bedbug by Meng Jinghui (from Chinese into English)

Other:
 The Empty Space by Peter Brook
 The Writer's Journey: Mythic Structure For Writers by Christopher Vogler
 "Theatre at Its Age of Acceleration" by Thomas Ostermeier

Awards and honors

 One Drama Award for Best Little Theater Performance of Year 2017 (Teahouse 2.0)
Best Chinese Production of Year 2016 (Lu Xun), The Beijing News
 Festival/Tokyo Award (The Warfare of Landmine 2.0), 2013
 Asian Cultural Council Fellowship, 2013
 Experimental Artist of the Year, The Beijing News, 2012
 Jury Award, Asian Theatre Directors’ Festival (Chairs 2.0), 2012
 Nomination for Best Production (e-Station), Mont-Laurier International Theatre Festival, 2009
 Han Suyin Award for Young Translators, Translators Association of China, 2007

See also
Théatre du Rêve Expérimental

References

External links 
Official site
Press coverage
Wang's weibo, disbanded in 2016

1982 births
Living people
Writers from Beijing
Chinese theatre directors
People's Republic of China translators
20th-century Chinese translators
21st-century Chinese translators